Events from the year 1812 in Denmark.

Incumbents
 Monarch – Frederick VI
 Prime minister – Frederik Moltke

Undated

Births
 25 February – Carl Christian Hall, politician, Danish prime minister (died 1888)
 8 March – Louis Gurlitt, painter (died 1897)
 24 March – Carl Dahl, painter (died 1865)
 25 May – Thorald Brendstrup, painter (died 1883)
 29 August – Adolph Peter Adler, theologian (died 1869)
 22 November – Johanne Luise Heiberg, actress (died 1890)

Deaths
 16 January – Pierre Peschier, merchant (born 1830)
 26 October – Hans Peter Holm, naval officer (born 1772)

References

 
1810s in Denmark
Denmark
Years of the 19th century in Denmark